Kakhaber Kacharava (born 19 November 1966) is a Georgian football coach and a former player. The former national team player was twice manager of Samtredia.

Personal life
His son Nika Kacharava is a footballer for the Georgia national team and Anorthosis Famagusta.

References

External links 
Kakhaber Kacharava on oGol

1966 births
Living people
Soviet footballers
Footballers from Georgia (country)
Georgia (country) international footballers
Süper Lig players
Cypriot First Division players
FC Dinamo Tbilisi players
Olympiakos Nicosia players
Trabzonspor footballers
Tennis Borussia Berlin players
FC 08 Homburg players
SV Waldhof Mannheim players
Expatriate sportspeople from Georgia (country) in Turkey
Expatriate sportspeople from Georgia (country) in Germany
Football managers from Georgia (country)
FC Dinamo Tbilisi managers
Expatriate footballers from Georgia (country)
Expatriate footballers in Cyprus
Expatriate footballers in Turkey
Expatriate footballers in Germany
Association football midfielders